Canta is a town in Peru.

Canta or Cantá may also refer to:

 Cantá, a municipality in Brazil
 Canta (magazine), a New Zealand magazine
 Canta (vehicle), a vehicle designed for disabled persons